Arthur Claerhout (3 December 1887 – 22 February 1978) was a Belgian racing cyclist. He rode in the 1920 Tour de France.

References

1887 births
1978 deaths
Belgian male cyclists
Place of birth missing